Andrew McCormick may refer to:
Andrew McCormick (rugby union), New Zealand born Japanese rugby union player
Andrew Phelps McCormick (1832–1916), United States federal judge
A. T. McCormick (1761–1841), Episcopal clergyman and Chaplain of the United States Senate

See also
Andrew McCormack (born 1978), New York-based British jazz pianist
Andrew MacCormac (1826–1918), portrait painter in South Australia